Pan de coco, literally "coconut bread" in Spanish, is a dense, cake-like bread from the Garifuna people of the Caribbean coast located in Honduras. It's dough features coconut milk as its main ingredient, and typically does not incorporate eggs or milk.  Despite its coconut content, the bread is not sweet and is often served with savory foods, like stews and soups. Many variations of Pan de Coco can be found in various other Latin American countries.

See also
Honduran cuisine
Latin American Cuisine

References 

Sweet breads
Breads
Foods containing coconut